Likelemba is an African solidarity savings mechanism where several members put a certain sum of money in a "pot" and, every month, the total amount contained in the pot is then donated to one of the participating members - a sort of little lottery.

Example
Twelve people - typically women - put 100€ every month in their "likelemba pot".
 Month 1, member 1 - normally chosen by chance  - gets 11 x 100€ = 1,100 €.
 Month 2, another member gets elected and rewarded with the 1,100 €, etc.

Benefits
The secret of the success of likelemba is its simplicity and formula whereby a lot of small amounts that every member can easily spare make one big prize. The winner has a fairly large amount with which he/she can do something extraordinary and, hopefully, break out of a financial circle of misery or difficult lifestyle.

External links
 Likelemba according to congoforum.be
 Likelemba.doc on congoforum.be

Personal finance
Lotteries